The Stone House of Indian Creek is located near Cynthiana, Kentucky.  It was built in c.1810 and added to the National Register of Historic Places in 1983.

It is a one-and-a-half-story central passage plan brick house with a dry stone wing added c.1830.

References

National Register of Historic Places in Harrison County, Kentucky
Federal architecture in Kentucky
Houses completed in 1810
Houses in Harrison County, Kentucky
Houses on the National Register of Historic Places in Kentucky
Central-passage houses
1810 establishments in Kentucky
Greek Revival architecture in Kentucky